The Lungwebungu River (in Angola Lungué Bungo) of Central Africa is the largest tributary of the upper Zambezi River.

The edges of the floodplain are a white sandy soil covered in thin forest.

While the river is a valuable resource to people living near it as a source of fish, its meanders make it unsuitable for water transport except in the wet season when canoes and small boats can navigate the floodwaters.

References 

Rivers of Angola
Rivers of Zambia
Tributaries of the Zambezi River
International rivers of Africa